A pledge fund is a collective investment scheme that allows backers to make investment decisions on deal-to-deal basis. It emerged after the dotcom bubble when many investors abandoned the conventional private equity fund format in favour of angel investor clubs that allowed members to decide on whether to take part in a certain investment opportunity. The model itself isn't limited to venture financing and can be applied across a multitude of business sectors wherein investments are made on per-deal basis.

Unlike the traditional private equity fund, the pledge fund allows investors to opt-in or opt-out of each investment opportunity the manager presents. The capital is contributed to a special purpose entity that purchases the shares. The fund may be organized within one SPV or establish separate SPVs for every portfolio investment. Execution of investors' right to opt-in and opt-out of deals makes pledge fund management, administration and documentation more complicated than of traditional private equity fund. Pledge fund model minimizes investing partners' capital risks but has certain drawbacks. For example, the extra time required to assess and screen investment opportunities and deal execution uncertainty may be disadvantageous in competitive acquisition process.

See also
Private equity
Private equity fund
Search fund

References

Private equity
Venture capital